Pál Rosty (24 November 1886 – 28 September 1912) was a Hungarian fencer. He competed in the individual épée event at the 1912 Summer Olympics.

References

External links
 

1886 births
1912 deaths
Hungarian male épée fencers
Olympic fencers of Hungary
Fencers at the 1912 Summer Olympics